Aston by Budworth is a civil parish in Cheshire East, England. It contains 32 buildings that are recorded in the National Heritage List for England as designated listed buildings.  Of these, one is listed at Grade I, the highest grade, three are listed at Grade II*, the middle grade, and the others are at Grade II. The major building in the parish is Arley Hall; this, together with a number of associated structures, is listed. Otherwise the parish is entirely rural, and the listed buildings are mainly houses, farmhouses, and farm buildings.

Key

Buildings

See also
Listed buildings in Antrobus
Listed buildings in Great Budworth
Listed buildings in High Legh
Listed buildings in Marston
Listed buildings in Mere
Listed buildings in Pickmere
Listed buildings in Tabley Superior

References
Citations

Sources

 

Listed buildings in the Borough of Cheshire East
Lists of listed buildings in Cheshire